Phalia (Urdu  ) is a town and headquarters of Phalia Tehsil of Mandi Bahauddin District, Punjab, Pakistan.

History
 
Alexander the Great and his army crossed the Jhelum in July 326 BC at the Battle of the Hydaspes River where he defeated the Indian king Porus.
According to Arrian (Anabasis, 29), he built a city on the spot whence he started to cross the river Hydaspes now Jhelum River, which he named Bukephala or Bucephala to honour his famous and loyal dead horse Bukephalus or Bucephalus. It is thought that ancient Bukephala was near the site of modern Jhelum City but that is wrong. Phalia was named after Bucephalus, the name of the Alexander's dead horse, and presently a tehsil of Mandi Bahauddin District. Alexander while going forward from Taxila, opted alternate way despite using traditional route i.e. today's Grand Trunk Road (road between Afghanistan and Bangladesh through Pakistan) and built two cities on opposite banks of the river Hydaspes on the route between Bhera and Mong.

In AD 997, Sultan Mahmud Ghaznavi, took over the Ghaznavid dynasty empire established by his father, Sultan Sebuktegin, In 1005 he conquered the Shahis in Kabul in 1005, and followed it by the conquests of Punjab region. The Delhi Sultanate and later Mughal Empire ruled the region. The Punjab region became predominantly Muslim due to missionary Sufi saints whose dargahs dot the landscape of Punjab region. 
Jalalpur Sharif is located on west of the river Jhelum whereas Phalia on eastern bank in Mandi Bahauddin District close to river Jhelum earlier known as Hydaspes. A semi hill or mound i.e. the historical sign of the ancient city and a shrine still available in mid of the Mohalla Ameer.  In 2010, maximum of the area reshaped into commercial land and precious heritage could not be preserved.

After the decline of the Mughal Empire, the Sikh invaded and occupied Mandi Bahauddin District. The Muslims faced severe restrictions during the Sikh rule. During the period of British rule, Mandi Bahauddin District increased in population and importance.

The predominantly Muslim population supported Muslim League and Pakistan Movement. After the independence of Pakistan in 1947, the minority Hindus and Sikhs migrated to India while the Muslims refugees from India settled down in the Mandi Bahauddin District.

Phalia is approximately the same age as Lahore. The four subdivisions (Mohallas) are named after the forefathers of Tarar tribe:
 Phalia  Ameer  for  "Muhammad Ameer"
 Phalia Keeman  for "Muhammad Karim" 
 Phalia Boota  for "Muhammad Boota" (also known as "Nawan Lok") 
 Phalia Mehman  for  "Muhammad Khan". .

Geography and climate
 
Phalia is situated at 32.43 N latitude and 73.58 E longitude.

Phalia has a moderate climate, which is hot in summer and cold in winter. The winter months are mild and the minimum temperature may fall below 
.

Schools and colleges

Schools
 THE EDUCATORS, Phalia Campus, A Project of Beaconhouse. Pioneer of student centered learning in the city.
 The Govt Pilot Secondary School Phalia, established in 1926 in Phalia.
 Govt. Islamia High School Phalia established in 1972 in Phalia.
 Government High School Pahrianwali, established at Pahrianwali – a famous town of Tehsil Phalia. 
 Govt. High School for Girls, Phalia
 International Islamic University, Islamabad, Phalia Campus IIUI Schools, Phalia Campus to provide modern education from Playgroup to GCE O/A Levels.
 Air Foundation Schools, Phalia Campus
 Ghazali Model High Schools, Main Campus Phalia  
  Pakistan Islamic Modern School (PIMS), Phalia
There are many other govt and private schools in Phalia.

Colleges
 Govt. Degree College for Girls, Phalia
 Govt. Commerce College for Boys, Phalia
 Govt. Peer Yaqoob Shah Degree College Phalia
 Ghazali Group Of Colleges Punjab, Pakistan. The branches of Punjab College and Farabi College are also operating in Phalia.

AIOU Study Center
 Allama Iqbal Open University opened a regional office in Phalia City at the Govt Pilot Secondary School Phalia

Health facilities
Health Medical facilities are on average available in the city. The main government hospital established in the city is THH (Tehsil Headquarters Hospital). There are several other private hospitals, Health center and Clinics at different locations within the city.

Phalia City
 Population and religions
Phalia is not a big city. Most of the population of the village are Muslim with some Christians.

 Languages
Punjabi language is the native language of the province and is most widely spoken language in Phalia. Urdu language has started to become more prominent in many areas now due to its official status as the national language.

 Registered voters
The number of registered voters in the Constituency PP-117 (Mandi Bahuddin-II) Phalia is 134,119 . among them almost half of them are of female voters.

Administration 
After the abolition of Nazim system, the Administrator of Phalia is Assistant Commissioner Bilal Feroz Joya in 2016.

Notable people
 Mustansar Hussain Tarar
 Muhammad Tariq Tarar 
 Pir Syed Muhammad Binyamin Rizvi
 Parvaiz Mehdi Qureshi
 Asif Bashir Bhagat
 Basma Riaz Choudhry
 Muhammad Ijaz Ahmed Chaudhary

References

 
Cities and towns in Mandi Bahauddin District
Tehsils of Punjab, Pakistan